Kalidasa Kannada Meshtru is a 2019 Indian Kannada-language comedy drama film directed by Kaviraj and starring Jaggesh and Meghana Gaonkar.

Plot 
Kalidasa, a government school teacher, is a hard worker who is ridiculed for his poor English skills. On the personal front, his upper-class wife is unhappy with his social status. When the school faces the threat of being shut down, Kalidasa takes it on himself to fight the education system.

Cast
 Jaggesh as Kalidasa
 Meghana Gaonkar as Suma, Kalidasa's wife
 T. S. Nagabharana
 Tabla Nani
 Ambika
 Raghu Ramankoppa

Cameo appearances in promotional song

 Rachita Ram
 Haripriya
 Amulya
 Shubha Poonja
 Aditi Prabhudeva
 Sonu Gowda
 Divya Uruduga
 Samyukta Hornad
 Harshika Poonacha
 Nishvika Naidu
 Sindhu Lokanath
 Krishi Thapanda
 Vaibhavi Jai Jagadish
 Vainidhi Jai Jagadish
 Vaisiri Jai Jagdish
 Anupama Gowda
 Karunya Ram
 Roopika
 Disha Poovaiah

Production
Kaviraj initially wanted to make a thriller with Jaggesh. Kaviraj was inspired to make this film after reading a newspaper article about a student writing his death note in an exam. Jaggesh's character is similar to the ones in his 1990s films.

Themes and influences
Jaggesh's and Meghana Gaonkar's characters are representations of Kali and Dasa, respectively.

Release
The film was scheduled to release on 15 November, but it released on 22 November.

Reception 
A. Sharadhaa of The New Indian Express opined that "Kalidasa Kannada Mestru ends with a thought -- educate children, but do not punish them. It is a well-timed film and will come in handy for parents preparing their children for exams. This is a topic that needs attention from the entire family". Sunayana Suresh of The Times of India wrote that "The film has its intent in place and does have a fair share of comedy and drama that ensure the audience is entertained." Shyam Prasad S. of Bangalore Mirror stated that "Kalidasa Kannada Meshtru is at the higher end of entertainment."

Television
The film premiered on television on 4 April 2020.

References 

2019 films
Indian comedy films
2010s Kannada-language films